Seaham Harbour railway station was a railway station that served the town of Seaham Harbour in County Durham, North East England. For much of its existence, it was the southern passenger terminus of the Londonderry, Seaham and Sunderland Railway but declined in importance after the opening of the nearby Seaham Colliery station and the extension of the line to West Hartlepool (avoiding Seaham Harbour station) by that company's successor.

History 
In 1854 the Londonderry Railway opened the Londonderry, Seaham and Sunderland Railway to link its network of colliery railways to the newly constructed South Dock in Sunderland due to the lack of capacity in Seaham Harbour. Though constructed primarily for mineral traffic, passengers were also carried on this line from 1855 and stations were opened at either end of the line. At the Seaham end of the line, a station was constructed on Marlborough Street and was originally named Seaham whilst at the Sunderland end, Hendon Burn station was constructed close to the staithes in the South Dock. From 1868, LS&SR began to use the Hendon terminus of the North Eastern Railway (NER) before that was in turn closed by the NER in 1879 to be replaced by Sunderland Central station and all LS&SR services were once again diverted into the new station.

The LS&SR did, however, remain independent until the Londonderry Railway agreed to sell its Seaham to Sunderland route to the NER in the Act of 30 July 1900 though this sale did not include Station Hotel which was attached to the Seaham station and had direct entrance from the station platform; the hotel remained under the ownership of the Marquess of Londonderry. However all through trains to West Hartlepool over the extension, left the original LS&SR passenger route just to the north of the original Seaham terminus, serving the new Seaham Colliery station instead and thus leaving the original Seaham station as the terminus of local trains to and from Sunderland.

In the 1923 grouping, the NER was absorbed into the London and North Eastern Railway (LNER).

Under the LNER, Seaham Harbour station retained a fairly frequent service of 14 trains per day, despite it having been superseded as the town's main station until it was closed as a wartime economy measure on 11 September 1939 and never reopened. The station buildings remained until they were demolished in 1971.

References

External links 

Disused railway stations in County Durham
Former North Eastern Railway (UK) stations
Railway stations in Great Britain opened in 1855
Railway stations in Great Britain closed in 1939
Seaham